No Sleep Tonight is a song by British post-hardcore band Enter Shikari, taken from their second studio album, Common Dreads. The song was released as a single on 31 July 2009.

Background and writing
The song was produced by Andy Gray at Arreton Manor in the Isle of Wight. Lead Singer Rou Reynolds explained to Kerrang!: "This song is about conscience and how more and more oil companies are simply concerned with short-term profit and will pay scientists to speak out about climate change."

Music video
The music video was released in early July 2009, on TV and can be seen on Enter Shikari's YouTube official account.

It was directed by Shane Davey (who also directed the video for the band's last single Juggernauts) and features many of the band's fans. It follows the story of a man who accidentally knocks into lead singer Rou Reynolds as he's on the phone, comes home from work, followed by Rou and is then continuously told "You're not getting any sleep tonight". We the audience get to see his failing marriage end due to his arrogant and loveless ways.

Charts

Track listing
CD
"No Sleep Tonight" - 4:16
"No Sleep Tonight" (Mistabishi Remix) - 4:16
"No Sleep Tonight" (LightsGoBlue Remix) - 4:37

Digital download
"No Sleep Tonight" - 4:16
"Juggernauts" (BBC Radio 1 Live Version) - 4:49
"No Sleep Tonight" (The Qemists Remix) - 6:00

Vinyl 7"
 "No Sleep Tonight" (The Qemists Remix) - 6:00
 "No Sleep Tonight" (Rout Remix) - 4:11

References

2009 singles
Enter Shikari songs
2009 songs